Kiss Me Kiss Me may refer to:

"Kiss Me Kiss Me", single by Wilma De Angelis, written Danell, 1990, covered by Bruno Martino Orchestra 1991
"Kiss Me Kiss Me", song by 5 Seconds of Summer from 5 Seconds of Summer (album) 2014

See also
Kiss Me, Kiss Me, Kiss Me album by British alternative rock band The Cure  1987
Kiss Me Kiss Me, Baby song by Japanese dance unit MAX . It is a Japanese cover of "Kiss me Kiss me, Babe" by the Italo disco group